Acacia kingiana was a species of wattle that occurred in an area north east of Wagin in the Avon Wheatbelt region of south-west Western Australia. It has been declared extinct under Australia's Environment Protection and Biodiversity Conservation Act 1999, 
and Western Australia's Wildlife Conservation Act 1950.

The species was described by Joseph Maiden and William Blakely in 1928. It grew in gravelly soil.

See also
List of Acacia species

References

kingiana
Acacias of Western Australia
Extinct flora of Australia
Fabales of Australia
Taxa named by Joseph Maiden
Taxa named by William Blakely